Valeriana edulis, the tobacco root or edible valerian, a species in the family Caprifoliaceae, is a dioecious perennial flowering plant native to western and central North America. Despite its common name, tobacco root is not closely related to tobacco, but is instead more closely related to elderberry, honeysuckle, and teasel (Caprifoliaceae s.l.).

Description 
Tobacco root is a long-lived herbaceous plant. Inflorescences are born on elongated, sparsely leaved stems usually around 0.75–1.5 meters tall. Flowers are small (0.5 mm diameter for pistillate flowers, 3–4 mm diameter for stamenate flowers) and cream or white. Flowering occurs in the summer months throughout most of its range.

Evolution 
Tobacco root and its close relatives in the Edulis clade of Valeriana is most closely related to the Central American clade.

Ecology 
Tobacco root typically grows in moist montane meadows and subalpine parks between  elevation, although herbarium collections are reported several hundred meters higher. Growth data indicate that individual plants may live up to 300 years.

The small, shallow flowers of tobacco root make its pollen and nectar resources available to a wide range of small, generalist pollinators. In Colorado, solitary bees, flies, and moths are the most frequent floral visitors.

Uses 
Tobacco root has long been used as food. One of the earliest written accounts is from the journal of explorer John Charles Frémont in the 1840s:
I ate here, for the first time, the kooyah, or tobacco root, (Valeriana edulis) the principal edible root among the Indians who inhabit the upper waters of the streams on the western side of the mountains. It has a very strong and remarkably peculiar taste and odor, which I can compare to no other vegetable that I am acquainted with, and which to some persons is extremely offensive. It was characterized by Mr. Preuss as the most horrid food he had ever put in his mouth; and when, in the evening, one of the chiefs sent his wife to me with a portion which she had prepared as a delicacy to regale us, the odor immediately drove him out of the lodge; and frequently afterwards he used to beg that when those who liked it had taken what they desired, it might be sent away. To others, however, the taste is rather an agreeable one, and I was afterwards always glad when it formed an addition to our scanty meals. It is full of nutriment; and in its unprepared state is said by the Indians to have very strong poisonous qualities, of which it is deprived by a peculiar process, being baked in the ground for about two days.The roots are best when collected in fall or spring, when firm. They can be steamed for 24 hours to remove the bad odor, then either used in soup or ground into flour.

References

External links
 
 

edulis
Dioecious plants